Ramón Lobo Leyder (born 23 January 1955) is a Spanish-Venezuelan journalist and writer who currently works for Spanish newspaper El País.

Biography 
Born in Venezuela to a Spanish father and an English mother, Ramón Lobo has been based in Spain since 1960. Graduated in Journalism from the Complutense University of Madrid, since 1975 he worked in various media such as Pyresa, Radio Intercontinental, Heraldo de Aragón, Radio 80, Actual, Voice of America, Expansión, Cinco Días, La Gaceta de los Negocios and El Sol.

From August 1992 until 2012, he worked as editor of the International section of El País, covering various conflicts: Croatia, Serbia and Kosovo, Bosnia-Herzegovina, Albania, Chechnya, Iraq, Lebanon, Argentina, Haiti, Rwanda, Nigeria, Equatorial Guinea, Sierra Leone, Uganda, Congo, Zimbabwe, Namibia and the Philippines.

In 2001, he received the XVIII Cirilo Rodríguez Journalism Award, granted by the Association of the Press of Segovia and has directed the summer course "The uncomfortable witnesses: Reporters in a conflict zone" at the King Juan Carlos University.

In 2012, at an event at the Miguel Hernández University of Elche (UMH) in which the journalist Juan R. Gil and the writer José Luis V. Ferris also participated, he recounted his experiences in journalism.

In 2013, he began collaborating with El Periódico de Catalunya, of the Zeta Group writing a weekly article on Sundays in the international section under the heading "Nomads", commenting on the main issues of global news.

In 2018, he returned to El País.

Works 
 El héroe inexistente (Aguilar, 1999): It is divided into three blocks: Balkan War, from Bosnia-Herzegovina until Kosovo-Serbia; the conflicts in Chechnya, Iraq and Haiti, and the wars in Rwanda, Zaire, Republic of Congo, Equatorial Guinea and Sierra Leone.
 Isla África (Seix Barral, 2001): situation in Sierra Leone and the child-soldiers.
 Cuadernos de Kabul (RBA, 2010)
 El autoestopista de Grozni y otras historias de fútbol (KO, 2012)
 Todos náufragos (Ediciones B, 2015)
 El día que murió Kapuściński (Círculo de Tiza, 2019)

References

External links 
 
 Interview with Ramón Lobo in the television program TESIS

1955 births
Living people
Venezuelan journalists
Spanish journalists
Venezuelan writers
People from Zulia
Spanish people of Venezuelan descent
Venezuelan people of Spanish descent
Venezuelan people of English descent